The Territory of Jefferson was an extralegal and unrecognized United States territory that existed from October 24, 1859 until the creation of the Colorado Territory on February 28, 1861. The Jefferson Territory, named for Founding Father and United States president Thomas Jefferson, included land officially part of the Kansas Territory, the Nebraska Territory, the New Mexico Territory, the Utah Territory, and the Washington Territory, but the area was remote from the governments of those five territories. 

The government of the Jefferson Territory, while democratically elected, was never legally recognized by the United States government, although it managed the territory with relatively free rein for 16 months. Many of the laws enacted by the Jefferson Territorial Legislature were reenacted and given official sanction by the new Colorado General Assembly in 1861.

Origins
On August 25, 1855, the Kansas Territory created Arapahoe County, a huge county that included the entire western portion of Kansas to the Rocky Mountains. The boundaries of Arapahoe County were defined as: beginning at the northeast corner of New Mexico, running thence north to the south line of Nebraska and north line of Kansas; thence along said line to the east line of Utah Territory; thence along said line between Utah and Kansas territories, to where said line strikes New Mexico; thence along the line between said New Mexico and the territory of Kansas to the place of beginning.

Occupied primarily by Cheyenne and Arapaho Indians with few white settlers, the county was never organized. The leaders of the Kansas Territory were preoccupied with the violent events of Bleeding Kansas, so little time or attention was available to attend to the needs of the far western portion of the territory. The question of whether to admit Kansas to the union as a slave state or free state dominated discussion in the populous eastern portion of the territory and led to three failed constitutional proposals between 1855 and 1858 (the Topeka, Lecompton and Leavenworth constitutions). The United States Congress was likewise preoccupied with threats of secession by the slave states.

In July 1858, the Pike's Peak Gold Rush began with the discovery of gold at the Dry Creek Diggings in Arapahoe County, Kansas Territory (now Englewood in Arapahoe County, Colorado). The gold rush brought 100,000 gold seekers to the area known as the Pike's Peak Country, which included Arapahoe County as well as the unorganized southwestern corner of the Nebraska Territory and parts of the New Mexico and Utah territories.

Kansas, with a growing divide between the eastern commercial centers and the central agricultural populations, had concerns over how the gold rush and the influx of miners to the Rockies could shift the base of power from the northeastern side of Kansas to the mountainous region in the west of the state. Meanwhile, the miners, being  from the capital of the territory, felt that the legislature was out of touch with their needs. They thought a new territory or state would have the benefit of being responsive to their economic situation and consolidate the population that was currently spread across four territories. Denver area leaders decided to pursue both a relationship with Kansas and a bid for separation by sending delegates to the Kansas Territorial Legislature and the United States Congress.

On February 7, 1859 the Kansas Territorial Legislature replaced Arapahoe County with six new unorganized counties and appointed county commissioners for each. However, since the commissioners were not provided a salary, they never took office. The settlers in the region attempted to organize a county on their own and on March 28, 1859, an election was held to elect officers. A total of 774 votes were cast, including 231 from Auraria and 144 from Denver City. A desire for a new territorial government kept the elected officials from taking their offices, as doing so would have given recognition to the Kansas Territorial government. In the meantime, Hiram J Graham, the local delegate to Congress, had successfully introduced a bill to establish a new territory in Pike's Peak Country. Though the bill did not pass, it nevertheless encouraged settlers to establish a separate government themselves.

Establishment

In April 1859, a small convention was held at Wootton's Hall in Auraria about the need for a local government. The name Jefferson (in honor of Thomas Jefferson, the third President of the United States who had authorized the 1803 Louisiana Purchase that included much of the proposed territory) was chosen and a constitutional convention was scheduled for June 6, 1859. The conventioneers met that day, and then adjourned until August 1, 1859, when 167 representatives from 37 districts met to draft a constitution for Jefferson State. The state constitution was subsequently rejected in a popular referendum on September 24 in favor of creating a territory, primarily because the organization of the territory would be funded by Congress while the organization of a state would be self-funded. The original authors determined to hold another convention on October 3 to draft a provisional constitution for the Territory of Jefferson.

The proposed Territory of Jefferson included all of the present State of Colorado, but it was 70 percent more extensive. The territory had the same southern boundary as the present State of Colorado, the 37th parallel north, but the northern boundary was set at the 43rd parallel north,  farther north than Colorado's current northern boundary, the 41st parallel north. In addition the eastern boundary was located about  farther east at the 102nd meridian west, and the western boundary about  farther west at the 110th meridian west. The territory was divided into eight council districts and 19 representative districts.

On October 24, 1859, an election was held to approve the formation of the Provisional Government of the Territory of Jefferson and to elect officials for the territory. The formation of a provisional government was approved by a vote of 1,852 to 280 and the following officials were elected:

On November 7, 1859, Governor Robert Williamson Steele opened the first session of the provisional Jefferson Territorial Legislature in Denver City with the following proclamation:

During this first session, the legislature organized 12 counties. (The Colorado General Assembly would create 17 counties with somewhat similar boundaries in 1861.) The legislature adjourned on December 7, 1859.

Many settlers from eastern Kansas preferred to be governed by that territory. Those resistant to the self-government of Jefferson Territory held an election on December 8, 1859, and elected Captain R. Sopris as their representative to the Kansas Territorial Legislature.

Governor Steele called the second session of the provisional Jefferson Territorial Legislature to meet at Denver City on January 23, 1860.

Many disappointed gold seekers left the region in 1860. The United States Census of 1860 counted approximately 35,000 persons in the region of the Jefferson Territory. Governor Steele pointed out that many gold seekers were working claims in remote areas and estimated that the total number of people in the Jefferson Territory was 60,000.

Governor Steele attempted to reach accommodation with the officials of the Kansas Territory. On August 7, 1860, Steele issued a proclamation requesting that the Provisional Government of the Jefferson Territory be merged into the Kansas Territory. Kansas officials would have no merger with what they considered to be an outlaw government, so the stalemate continued.

On November 7, 1860, the U.S. presidential election produced a victory for Abraham Lincoln and precipitated the secession of seven slave states and the formation of the Confederate States of America. These events eliminated any chance for federal endorsement of the Territory of Jefferson and any role in government for Governor Steele, a staunch pro-Union Democrat and vocal opponent of Lincoln and the Republican Party.

Seeking to augment the political power of the free states, the Republican-led U.S. Congress hurriedly admitted the portion of the Territory of Kansas east of the 25th meridian west from Washington to the Union as the free State of Kansas on January 29, 1861. Kansas statehood left the western portion of the now defunct Kansas Territory, which the Jefferson Territory also claimed, officially unorganized. While the federal government refused to sanction the Jefferson Territory, it had effectively acknowledged the eastern border of the region.

Counties

On November 28, 1859, the Territory of Jefferson created 12 counties:
Arrappahoe County, county seat Denver City, evolved into Arapahoe and Douglas counties, Colorado Territory.
Cheyenne County evolved into southern Laramie County, Wyoming Territory.
El Paso County, county seat Colorado City, evolved into El Paso County, Colorado Territory.
Fountain County, county seat Pueblo, evolved into Pueblo, Fremont, and Huerfano counties, Colorado Territory.
Heele County, county seat La Porte, evolved into eastern Larimer County, Colorado Territory.
Jackson County, county seat Boulder City, evolved into Boulder County, Colorado Territory
Jefferson County, county seat Arapahoe City, evolved into Jefferson County, Colorado Territory
Mountain County, county seat Central City, evolved into Gilpin and Clear Creek counties, Colorado Territory.
North County evolved into western Larimer County, Colorado Territory.
Park County, county seat Tarryall City, evolved into Park County, Colorado Territory.
Saratoga County, county seat Breckinridge, evolved into Summit County, Colorado Territory.
Saint Vrain's CountySt. Vrain's County, county seat Saint VrainSt. Vrain, evolved into Weld County, Colorado Territory.

Capitals
Denver City – October 24, 1859, to November 13, 1860.
Golden City – November 13, 1860, to June 6, 1861.
Most administrative affairs of the Territory of Jefferson were handled at the home of Governor Steele at Mount Vernon.

Dissolution
On February 26, 1861, Congress passed a bill organizing the Territory of Colorado. The bill was signed into law by U.S. President James Buchanan two days later on February 28, 1861. On May 29, 1861, William Gilpin, newly appointed Governor of the Territory of Colorado, arrived in Denver City. Most citizens of the region welcomed their new government. On June 6, 1861, Governor Steele issued a proclamation declaring the Territory of Jefferson disbanded and urging all employees and residents to abide by the laws governing the United States.

See also
Colorado counties
Governor of the Territory of Jefferson
Jefferson (proposed Pacific state)
Jefferson (proposed Southern state)
Absaroka (proposed state)
Franklin (proposed state)
Lincoln (proposed Northwestern state)
Lincoln (proposed Southern state)
Superior (proposed U.S. state), proposed Midwestern state
Cascadia (independence movement)
List of U.S. state partition proposals
List of governors of dependent territories in the 19th century

References

"Gold Fever in Kansas Territory: Migration to the Pike's Peak Gold Fields, 1858–1860" by Calvin W. Gower, Kansas Historical Quarterly, Spring, 1973 (Vol. 39, No. 1), pages 58 to 74

External links
The New Territory of Jefferson The New York Times, 25 August 1859
Fiftyniners' Directory: Colorado Argonauts 1858–1859 Denver Public Library

1858 in Kansas Territory
1858 in Nebraska Territory
1858 in New Mexico Territory
1858 in Utah Territory
1859 establishments in the United States
1861 disestablishments in the United States
1861 in Colorado Territory
.
Former regions and territories of the United States
History of the American West
 
Kansas Territory
New Mexico Territory
Pre-statehood history of Colorado
Pre-statehood history of Wyoming
Proposed states and territories of the United States
States and territories disestablished in 1861
States and territories established in 1859
Utah Territory
Washington Territory